Thomas Simpson (born 1880; date of death unknown) was a footballer who played as a forward for Stoke, Burslem Port Vale, and Bury in the early 1900s.

Career
Simpson played for Cross Heath and Stoke, before joining nearby Burslem Port Vale in August 1901. He played six Second Division matches in the 1901–02 season and played 11 league games in the 1902–03 season. He scored his first goal in the Football League in a 3–1 win over Burnley at the Athletic Ground on 30 March 1903. He went on to score 15 goals in 30 league and FA Cup games in the 1903–04 campaign, including strikes against both Woolwich Arsenal and Manchester United. He scored four goals in ten league games in the 1904–05 season, and also claimed a hat-trick against Stoke in the Birmingham Senior Cup. He was sold to Bury for a £200 fee in December 1904. The "Shakers" posted 17th-place finishes in the First Division in 1904–05 and 1905–06, with Simpson contributing eight goals in 20 league games at Gigg Lane.

Career statistics
Source:

References

1880 births
Year of death missing
English footballers
Association football forwards
Stoke City F.C. players
Port Vale F.C. players
Bury F.C. players
English Football League players